The Protocol to the 1979 Convention on Long-Range Transboundary Air Pollution on Further Reduction of Sulphur Emissions is an agreement to provide for a further reduction in sulphur emissions or transboundary fluxes. It is a protocol to the Convention on Long-Range Transboundary Air Pollution and supplements the 1985 Helsinki Protocol on the Reduction of Sulphur Emissions.

opened for signature - 14 June 1994

entered into force - 5 August 1998

parties - (29) Austria, Belgium, Bulgaria, Canada, Croatia, Cyprus, Czech Republic, Denmark, European Union, Finland, France, Germany, Greece, Hungary, Ireland, Italy, Liechtenstein, Lithuania, Luxembourg, Republic of Macedonia, Monaco, Netherlands, Norway, Slovakia, Slovenia, Spain, Sweden, Switzerland, United Kingdom

countries that have signed, but not yet ratified - (3) Poland, Russia, Ukraine

External links
"1994 Oslo Protocol on Further Reduction of Sulphur Emissions", unece.org.
Text.
Signatures and ratifications.

Treaties concluded in 1994
Treaties entered into force in 1998
Sulfur
Air pollution
Environmental treaties
1998 in the environment
1994 in Norway
Treaties of Austria
Treaties of Belgium
Treaties of Bulgaria
Treaties of Canada
Treaties of Croatia
Treaties of Cyprus
Treaties of the Czech Republic
Treaties of Denmark
Treaties entered into by the European Union
Treaties of Finland
Treaties of France
Treaties of Germany
Treaties of Greece
Treaties of Hungary
Treaties of Ireland
Treaties of Italy
Treaties of Liechtenstein
Treaties of Lithuania
Treaties of Luxembourg
Treaties of North Macedonia
Treaties of Monaco
Treaties of the Netherlands
Treaties of Norway
Treaties of Slovakia
Treaties of Slovenia
Treaties of Spain
Treaties of Sweden
Treaties of Switzerland
Treaties of the United Kingdom
Waste treaties
Convention on Long-Range Transboundary Air Pollution
Treaties extended to Jersey
Treaties extended to the Isle of Man
United Nations Economic Commission for Europe treaties